In mathematics, a homogeneous polynomial, sometimes called quantic in older texts, is a polynomial whose nonzero terms all have the same degree. For example,  is a homogeneous polynomial of degree 5, in two variables; the sum of the exponents in each term is always 5. The polynomial  is not homogeneous, because the sum of exponents does not match from term to term. The function defined by a homogeneous polynomial is always a homogeneous function.  

An algebraic form, or simply form, is a function defined by a homogeneous polynomial. A binary form is a form in two variables. A form is also a function defined on a vector space, which may be expressed as a homogeneous function of the coordinates over any basis.

A polynomial of degree 0 is always homogeneous; it is simply an element of the field or ring of the coefficients, usually called a constant or a scalar. A form of degree 1 is a linear form. A form of degree 2 is a quadratic form. In geometry, the Euclidean distance is the square root of a quadratic form.

Homogeneous polynomials are ubiquitous in mathematics and physics. They play a fundamental role in algebraic geometry, as a projective algebraic variety is defined as the set of  the common zeros of a set of homogeneous polynomials.

Properties
A homogeneous polynomial defines a homogeneous function. This means that, if a multivariate polynomial P is homogeneous of degree d, then

for every  in any field containing the coefficients of P. Conversely, if the above relation is true for infinitely many   then the polynomial is homogeneous of degree d.

In particular, if P is homogeneous then 

for every  This property is fundamental in the definition of a projective variety.

Any nonzero polynomial may be decomposed, in a unique way, as a sum of homogeneous polynomials of different degrees, which are called the homogeneous components of the polynomial. 

Given a polynomial ring  over a field (or, more generally, a ring) K, the homogeneous polynomials of degree d form

The dimension of the vector space (or free module)  is the number of different monomials of degree d in n variables (that is the maximal number of nonzero terms in a homogeneous polynomial of degree d in n variables). It is equal to the binomial coefficient

Homogeneous polynomial satisfy  Euler's identity for homogeneous functions. That is, if  is a homogeneous polynomial of degree  in the indeterminates  one has, whichever is the commutative ring of the coefficients,

Homogenization
A non-homogeneous polynomial P(x1,...,xn) can be homogenized by introducing an additional variable x0 and defining the homogeneous polynomial sometimes denoted hP:

where d is the degree of P. For example, if

then

A homogenized polynomial can be dehomogenized by setting the additional variable x0 = 1. That is

See also

Multi-homogeneous polynomial
Quasi-homogeneous polynomial
Diagonal form
Graded algebra
Hilbert series and Hilbert polynomial
Multilinear form
Multilinear map
Polarization of an algebraic form
Schur polynomial
Symbol of a differential operator

References

External links

 
Multilinear algebra
Algebraic geometry